Commentaries on the Bible may refer to:
 List of Biblical commentaries
 Jewish commentaries on the Bible

See also 
 Bible commentary